Casuarina Coast Asmat is a Papuan language spoken along the Casuarina Coast of southern West New Guinea (in the region around the mouth of the Pulau River) by the Asmat people. It's the most divergent of the Asmat languages.

References

Asmat-Kamoro languages
Languages of western New Guinea